The surname Chernev may refer to:

Irving Chernev (1900-1981), Russian-American chess author
Lyubomir Chernev, Bulgarian footballer
, Bulgarian film director
Petar Chernev, a mayor of Sofia, Bulgaria
Pavel Chernev, Bulgarian politician

Bulgarian-language surnames